The Catholic Church is a church in Șimleu Silvaniei, Romania.

The church was built in 1534 by Transylvania's voivode Báthory István and his wife with the occasion of theirs son's birth.

Photos

References

External links
 Şimleu Silvaniei, Catholic church

Roman Catholic churches completed in 1534
Places of worship in Șimleu Silvaniei
Monuments and memorials in Șimleu Silvaniei
Churches in Sălaj County
1534 establishments in Europe
16th-century establishments in Romania
Historic monuments in Sălaj County
16th-century Roman Catholic church buildings in Romania